The former French Catholic diocese of Die existed from the fourth to the thirteenth century, and then again from  1678 to the French Revolution. It was suppressed by the Concordat of 1801, its territory being assigned to the diocese of Grenoble. Its see was the Cathedral of the Assumption in Die.

History
Situated on the River Drôme, Die was one of the nineteen principal towns of the tribe of the Vocontii.  It was made a Roman colony by the Emperor Augustus in the 20s B.C.

The Carthusian Polycarpe de la Rivière gives a St. Martinus (220) as first Bishop of Die; his assertion has been doubted. The oldest historically known bishop, St. Nicasius, attended the First Council of Nicaea in 325. Audentius attended three regional councils, at Riez (439), Orange (441), and Vaison (442). After them are mentioned: St. Petronius, followed by his brother St. Marcellus (c. 463), confessor and miracle-worker; Lucretius (541–573), to whom St. Ferreolus of Uzes dedicated his monastic rule. For various reasons Abbé Jules Chevalier omits from the episcopal list: St. Maximus (sixth century); Wulphinus (end of eighth century); Exuperius and Saturninus (ninth century). Other bishops were: Hugh (1073–83), consecrated at Rome by Gregory VII, became a papal legate of the latter, presided over numerous councils for the reform of the Church, and subsequently became Bishop of Lyon; Ismido (1098–1115) of the noble house of Sassenage;  Uric (1129–42), who opposed the Petrobrusian heresy in his diocese and became a Carthusian; Blessed Bernard (1173–76); Stephen (1203–1208), formerly a Carthusian at the monastery of Portes; Blessed Didier (Desiderius) de Lans (1213–20).

The Cathedral of Die was dedicated to the Assumption of the Virgin Mary.  The Cathedral Chapter had two dignities, the Dean and the Sacristan, and ten other Canons.  In the thirteenth century the diocese was divided for administrative purposes into four Archpresbyteries:  the Archpriest of Die, the Archpriest of Trivilis (Trièves), the Archpriest of Deserto, the Archpriest of Crista. There was a Collegiate Church at Crest (Crista) dedicated to Saint-Sauveur, which had a Provost, a Cantor, and six Canons.

After the eleventh century the Diocese of Die, long disputed between the metropolitans of Vienne and Arles, became suffragan of the archbishopric of Vienne. On 28 March 1165 Pope Alexander III confirmed by papal bull the grant to the Church of Die on the part of Arnaud de Crest and Guillaume of Poitiers of the abbeys of S. Marcel de Die, Saint-Medard, Saint-Croix, Saint Julien-de-Guiniaise, Leoncel, and Saou.  The bull also confirms the possession of the entire city of Die and nine castle-towns including Crista. By Papal Bull of 25 September 1275, in order to strengthen the Church of Valence in its struggle with the House of Poitiers, Gregory X united the Diocese of Die with that of Valence. Five days later, on 30 September,  Pope Gregory wrote to Abbot Amadeus of Roussillon, informing him that he had been named Bishop of Valence in succession to Bishop Guy, who had died in 1272.  It was no accident that Amadeus of Roussillon was the nephew of Amadeus of Geneva, Bishop of Die.  Amadeus of Roussillon was present at the bedside of his uncle when he made his Testament on 21 January 1276.  Bishop Amadeus of Die died on 22 October 1276, and his nephew Amadeus of Roussillon became Bishop of Valence and Die.

This union, which lasted four centuries, was unfortunate for the Church in Die. The Huguenot sect, derived from the Calvinism of Geneva, had taken firm hold in the Dauphiné, and in particular in the Alpine valleys.  In order to combat Protestantism, therefore, King Louis XIV, published the Edict of Fontainebleau on 22 October 1685, revoking the special rights granted to Protestants in France in the Edict of Nantes.   King Louis revived the diocese of Die and appointed a Bishop of Die in 1687.  From the point of view of the Roman Catholic Church, however, the union of the two dioceses was dissolved canonically in the Consistory of 7 July 1692 by Pope Innocent XII.  On 10 September 1692, the Bishop of Die, Armand de Montmorin Saint-Hérem, had an interview with James II of England and Louis XIV.  Asked for a report on the state of the Dauphiné, inter alia the Bishop reported that Die was entirely in the hands of the Huguenots.

In 1790 the Civil Constitution of the Clergy reduced the number of dioceses in France from 135 to 83,  and ordered that they be coterminous with the new départments of the civil organization.  Each départment was authorized and ordered to elect its own bishop; the electors did not have to be Catholic, and that fact alone created a schism between the Constitutional Church and Constitutional Bishops and the Roman Catholic Church.  Bishop Gaspard-Alexis Plan des Augiers protested, and then fled his diocese; he died in exile in Rome in 1794. On 21 February 1791, the Constitutional diocese of Drôme elected François Marbos, curé of the parish of Bourg-lez-Valence as their 'bishop'.  He was consecrated in Paris on 3 April 1791, by Jean Baptiste Gobel of Paris, assisted by Bishops Mirodot and Gouttes.  After the Concordat of 1801 he retracted his errors, and died in communion with Rome in 1825.

Bishops

to 1276

Nicaise  : 325
Audentius  : c. 439
Petronius 
Marcellus : 463
Saeculatius : 517, 518
Lucretius : 541, 573
Paul : 585
Maximus : 614
Desideratus : 788
Remigius  : 859
Aurelius : 875
Hemico 879
Achideus : 957
Wulfinus (Wulfade) : 974
Conon (Cuno) : 1037
Pierre I  : 1055
Lancelin 1073
Hugues de Romans 1082
Ponce : 1084–1086
Bernard
Ismido (Ismidon de Sassenage) : 1097/8?–1115
Pierre II : 1116–1119
Étienne : 1121–1127
Ulric (Odolric) : 1130
Hugues, : died in 1159
Pierre III : 1163–1173
Bernard : 1176
Humbert  : 1199–1212
Étienne de Chatillon : died 1213
 Desiderius de Forcalquier (Didier de Lans) 1213–1222
Bertrand D'Étoile 1223–1235
Humbert II 1235–1245, resigned
Amedée de Genève 1245–1276

United with the diocese of Valence (1276–1687)

from 1687 to 1801
[Daniel de Cosnac : 1687–1691]
Armand de Montmorin Saint-Hérem :  1691–1694
Séraphin de Pajot de Plouy : 1694–1701
Gabriel de Cosnac : 1701–1734
Daniel-Joseph de Cosnac : 1734–1741
Gaspard-Alexis Plan des Augiers 1741–1794, last bishop of Valence and Die

See also
 Catholic Church in France
 List of Catholic dioceses in France

References

Books
 [Lists of Bishops, Provosts, Deans, and Sacristans of the Cathedral of Die]
Chevalier, C.U.J (1868), Documents inédits relatifs au Dauphiné.  Grenoble: Prudhomme.

 second edition (in French)
  (in Latin) 
 (Use with caution; obsolete)

 

Die
Religious organizations established in 1678
Die
1678 establishments in France
1801 disestablishments in France
Die, Drôme